Walter Sisulu Local Municipality is an administrative area in the Joe Gqabi District of the Eastern Cape in South Africa. The municipality was formed by the merging of Maletswai and Gariep Local Municipality immediately after the August 2016 Local Municipal Elections.

Main places
Main places in the municipality (historical Gariep and Maletswai) are:

Neighbours
The neighbour of Walter Sisulu Local Municipality in the Joe Gqabi District Municipality (DC14) is Senqu Local Municipality to the East. South of Walter Sisulu lies the Chris Hani District Municipality (DC13). On the Free State side is Mohokare Local Municipality in the Xhariep District Municipality (DC16).

Politics 

The municipal council consists of twenty-two members elected by mixed-member proportional representation. Eleven councillors are elected by first-past-the-post voting in eleven wards, while the remaining eleven are chosen from party lists so that the total number of party representatives is proportional to the number of votes received. In the 2021 South African municipal elections the African National Congress (ANC) won a reduced majority of twelve seats on the council.

The following table shows the results of the election.

References

Local municipalities of the Joe Gqabi District Municipality